The Chesapeake and Ohio Canal commemorative obelisk is an  marble obelisk erected in 1850 in Washington, D.C., to mark the completion of the Chesapeake and Ohio Canal to Cumberland, Maryland. It stands on the northwest corner of the Wisconsin Avenue Bridge over the canal in Washington's Georgetown neighborhood.

Description
The monument is inscribed on all four sides:
Northeast: “CHESAPEAKE & OHIO CANAL./ Commenced at Georgetown./ July 4TH 1828./ Chief Engineer / BENJAMIN WRIGHT.”
Northwest: “CHESAPEAKE & OHIO CANAL./ COMPLETED TO CUMBERLAND./ OCTR. 10TH 1850./ CHIEF ENGINEER/ CHARLES B. FISK.”
Southeast: CHESAPEAKE & OHIO CANAL/ COMPANY 1850/ President/ JAMES M. COALE./ Directors / WILLIAM A. BRADLEY,/ HENRY DAINGERFIELD,/ WM. COST JOHNSON,/ JOHN PICKELL,/ GEORGE SCHLEY,/ SAMUEL P. SMITH,/ Clerk/ WALTER S. RINGOL, / Treasurer / LAWRENCE J. BRENGLE.” 
Southwest: “MARYLAND STATE AGENTS./ SAMUEL SPRIGG,/ ALLEN B. DAVIS, WM. T. GOLDSBOROUGH, TENCH TILGHMAN, JOHN VAN LEAR.”

History
The obelisk was restored in 2005.

References

External links
 

Monuments and memorials in Washington, D.C.
Outdoor sculptures in Washington, D.C.
Obelisks in the United States